Optoacoustic imaging could refer to:

Photoacoustic imaging
Multispectral optoacoustic tomography